Parmelee is a surname. Notable people with the surname include:

Arthur H. Parmelee (1883–1961), U.S. physician and football coach
Ashbel P. Fitch (P. for Parmelee; 1848–1904), U.S. Representative from the state of New York
Charles Henry Parmelee (1855–1914), Canadian publisher and politician
Chris Parmelee (born 1988), U.S. baseball player
Edward Parmelee Smith (1827–1876), U.S. religious leader, educator, co-founder of Fisk University
Henry S. Parmelee (1846–1902), U.S. inventor, piano manufacturer, and streetcar/tram company president
Horace Parmelee (1889–1957), U.S. talent manager and concert promoter
Irene E. Parmelee (1847–1934), U.S. portrait artist
James Parmelee ( 1886), U.S. financier
Martha Parmelee Rose (1834-1923), U.S. journalist, reformer and philanthropist
Philip Orin Parmelee (1887–1912), U.S. aviation pioneer
Roy Parmelee (1907–1981), U.S. baseball player

See also
Jalen Parmele (born 1985), U.S. football player
Mary Platt Parmele (1843–1911), U.S. author and historian